The 1975–76 Southern Football League season was the 73rd in the history of the league, an English football competition.

Wimbledon won the championship, winning their second Southern League title in a row, whilst AP Leamington, Redditch United, Dartford and Minehead were all promoted to the Premier Division. Six Southern League clubs applied to join the Football League at the end of the season, but none were successful.

Premier Division
The Premier Division consisted of 22 clubs, including 18 clubs from the previous season and four new clubs:
Two clubs promoted from Division One North:
Bedford Town
Dunstable Town

Two clubs promoted from Division One South:
Gravesend & Northfleet
Hillingdon Borough

Midway through the season Dunstable Town and Tonbridge folded, their records was transferred to the new clubs Dunstable and Tonbridge Angels respectively, with both clubs to be demoted to divisions One wherever they finish. Thus, Wealdstone was reprieved from relegation.

League table

Division One North
Division One North consisted of 22 clubs, including 20 clubs from the previous season and two new clubs:
Barnet, relegated from the Premier Division
Oswestry Town, joined from the Cheshire County League

League table

Division One South
Division One South consisted of 20 clubs, including 17 clubs from the previous season and three clubs, relegated from the Premier Division:
Dartford
Guildford & Dorking United
Romford

League table

Football League elections
Alongside the four League clubs facing re-election, a total of nine non-League clubs applied for election, six of which were Southern League clubs. All the League clubs were re-elected.

See also
 Southern Football League
 1975–76 Northern Premier League

References
RSSF – Southern Football League archive

Southern Football League seasons
S